Company of Sirens is a Canadian feminist theatre company formed in 1986. Company of Sirens developed the feminist play The Working People's Picture Show.

History 
Company of Sirens was officially founded in 1986 by Lina Chartrand, Aida Jordão, Catherine Glen, Lib Spry, Shawna Dempsey, and Cynthia Grant. Grant came to work with the new company after leaving Nightwood Theatre to work with a theatre that was more political and had more of a collective structure. The women founded Company of Sirens after coming together to work on a commission from Organized Working Women.

The Working People's Picture Show (WPPS) was commissioned by Organized Working Women in 1985 to celebrate their 10th anniversary and began as a ten-minute piece. The show developed into a full-length play and subsequently toured Ontario. In 1987, they performed WPPS on International Women's Day with sponsorship from Canadian Action for Nicaragua and the March 8 Coalition. Company of Sirens continued to perform WPPS in various contexts for at least six years after its premiere. Lois Sweet of the Toronto Star described WPPS as "blatantly pro-union [and] pro-feminist".

In 1991, Company of Sirens received a $12,500 grant from Metro Toronto's arts budget. This funding was criticized by Toronto Star arts critic, Gina Mallet, whom the company felt to have a prejudice against small, independent, theatre.

Production history 

1987

 The Working People's Picture Show

1988

 The Working People's Picture Show at From The Ground theatre festival

1990

 Shelter From Assault, as part of a fundraiser for The Denise House

1991

 Djuna: What of the Night written and directed by Cynthia Grant and Svetlana Zylin
 Whenever I Feel Afraid

1992

 Penelope by Margaret Atwood, Cynthia Grant, Peggy Sample, and Susan Seagrove

1993

 Little Miss Easter Seals written by Lina Chartrand, directed by Cynthia Grant

1994

 The Catharine Wheel written by Ingrid MacDonald, directed by Cynthia Grant, show co-sponsored by Buddies In Bad Times

1996

 A Canadian Monsoon written and directed by Sheila James

1998

 The Destruction of Eve by Svetlana Zylin

Awards

Notable performers 

 Susan Hogan (Djuna: What of the Night - 1991)
 Henriette Ivanens (Little Miss Easter Seals - 1993)
 Kim Renders (Djuna: What of the Night - 1991)
 Shakura S'Aida (The Destruction of Eve - 1998)

References 

Feminist theatre
Theatre companies in Toronto
1986 establishments in Ontario
20th-century theatre
21st-century theatre
Women in theatre
Canadian theatre company production histories